Tenaliraman may refer to:

 Tenali Ramakrishna, a Telugu poet of the 16th century CE
 Tenaliraman (film), a 2014 Tamil historical fiction political satire comedy film